The 2022 Tour de Pologne was the 79th edition of the Tour de Pologne road cycling stage race, which was part of the 2022 UCI World Tour. It started on 30 July in Kielce and finished on 5 August in Kraków.

Teams 
All eighteen UCI WorldTeams, four UCI ProTeams, and the Polish national team made up the twenty-three teams that participated in the race.

UCI WorldTeams

 
 
 
 
 
 
 
 
 
 
 
 
 
 
 
 
 
 

UCI ProTeams

 
 
 
 

National Teams

 Poland

Schedule

Stages

Stage 1 
30 July 2022 – Kielce to Lublin,

Stage 2 
31 July 2022 – Chełm to Zamość,

Stage 3 
1 August 2022 – Kraśnik to Przemyśl,

Stage 4 
2 August 2022 – Lesko to Sanok,

Stage 5 
3 August 2022 – Łańcut to Rzeszów,

Stage 6 
4 August 2022 – Nowy Targ, Gronków to Bukovina Resort,  (ITT)

Stage 7 
5 August 2022 – Skawina to Kraków,

Classification leadership table

Final classification standings

General classification

Sprints classification

Mountains classification

Active rider classification

Team classification

External links

References 

2022
2022 UCI World Tour
July 2022 sports events in Poland
August 2022 sports events in Poland
2022 in Polish sport